"Build Me Up Buttercup" is a song written by Mike d'Abo and Tony Macaulay, and released by the Foundations in 1968 with Colin Young singing lead vocals. Young had replaced Clem Curtis during 1968, and this was the first Foundations hit on which he sang.

It hit No. 1 on the Cash Box Top 100 and No. 3 on the US Billboard Hot 100 in early 1969.  It was also a No. 2 hit in the United Kingdom, for two non-consecutive weeks, behind "Lily the Pink" by the Scaffold. It was quickly certified gold by the RIAA for sales of over a million US copies.

In popular culture
"Build Me Up Buttercup" is featured in the 1998 romantic comedy film There's Something About Mary and the episode "Art Imitates Art" from the fourth season of the CBS TV detective series Elementary. The track also features in the 2020 film The Kissing Booth 2, as well as in a series of 202021 Geico commercials.

Charts

Weekly charts

Year-end charts

Certifications

Personnel
 Colin Young – vocals
 Alan Warner – lead guitar
 Peter Macbeth – bass guitar
 Tim Harris – drums, percussion
 Tony Gomez – keyboards
 Mike Elliott – tenor saxophone
 Eric Allandale – trombone
 Mike D'Abo – piano

Other versions
A version by British trio Partyboys reached No. 44 on the UK Singles Chart in 2003.

References

External links
 CRITICAL BEATDOWN by Steven Shaviro
 

1968 songs
1968 singles
The Foundations songs
Number-one singles in Australia
Cashbox number-one singles
RPM Top Singles number-one singles
Los Angeles Angels
Songs written by Tony Macaulay
Songs written by Mike d'Abo
CNR Music singles
Pye Records singles
Uni Records singles